A unitary perfect number is an integer which is the sum of its positive proper unitary divisors, not including the number itself (a divisor d of a number n is a unitary divisor if d and n/d share no common factors). Some perfect numbers are not unitary perfect numbers, and some unitary perfect numbers are not ordinary perfect numbers.

Known examples
The number 60 is a unitary perfect number, because 1, 3, 4, 5, 12, 15, and 20 are its proper unitary divisors, and 1 + 3 + 4 + 5 + 12 + 15 + 20 = 60. The respective sums of their proper unitary divisors are as follows:
 6 = 1 + 2 + 3
 60 = 1 + 3 + 4 + 5 + 12 + 15 + 20
 90 = 1 + 2 + 5 + 9 + 10 + 18 + 45
 87360 = 1 + 3 + 5 + 7 + 13 + 15 + 21 + 35 + 39 + 64 + 65 + 91 + 105 + 192 + 195 + 273 + 320 + 448 + 455 + 832 + 960 + 1344 + 1365 + 2240 + 2496 + 4160 + 5824 + 6720 + 12480 + 17472 + 29120
 146361946186458562560000 = 1 + 3 + 7 + 11 + ... + 13305631471496232960000 + 20908849455208366080000 + 48787315395486187520000 (4095 divisors in the sum)

Properties
There are no odd unitary perfect numbers. This follows since 2d*(n) divides the sum of the unitary divisors of an odd number n, where d*(n) is the number of distinct prime factors of n. One gets this because the sum of all the unitary divisors is a multiplicative function and one has that the sum of the unitary divisors of a prime power pa is pa + 1 which is even for all odd primes p. Therefore, an odd unitary perfect number must have only one distinct prime factor, and it is not hard to show that a power of prime cannot be a unitary perfect number, since there are not enough divisors. 

It is not known whether or not there are infinitely many unitary perfect numbers, or indeed whether there are any further examples beyond the five already known.  A sixth such number would have at least nine odd prime factors.

References 

   Section B3.
 
 
 

Integer sequences
Perfect numbers